Jesse Clement House is a historic home located at Mocksville, Davie County, North Carolina. It was built about 1828, and is a two-story, three bay, vernacular Federal style brick dwelling.  It has a center hall plan.

It was added to the National Register of Historic Places in 1980.

References

Houses on the National Register of Historic Places in North Carolina
Federal architecture in North Carolina
Houses completed in 1828
Houses in Davie County, North Carolina
National Register of Historic Places in Davie County, North Carolina